Chianca de Garcia (14 May 1898 – 28 January 1983) was a Portuguese film director.

 Pureza 1940 based on Pureza (José Lins do Rego novel)

References

Portuguese film directors
1898 births
1983 deaths
People from Lisbon